Žubejevo ( or ) is a small dispersed settlement above the Tuhinj Valley in the Municipality of Kamnik in the Upper Carniola region of Slovenia.

References

External links

Žubejevo on Geopedia

Populated places in the Municipality of Kamnik